Ottiero Ottieri (1924–2002) was an Italian sociologist and writer.

1924 births
2002 deaths
Italian sociologists